Rachel V. Lyon is an American film director and producer.

Career

Lyon has produced more than 65 feature films, movies-for-television, feature documentaries, and limited series for PBS, NBC, CNN, National Geographic, and the History Channel. In 1980, she produced Tell Me A Riddle, which was directed by Academy Award-winner Lee Grant. Her 1985 FRONTLINE television documentary, Men Who Molest, received an Emmy for Outstanding Background/Analysis of a Single Current Story. Lyon's 2014 film Hate Crimes in the Heartland received the Paul Robeson Award for Best Feature Documentary at the Newark Black Film Festival.

Lyon is the CEO of Lioness Media Arts, Inc.

Scholarship

Lyon has held faculty positions at Bentley University, Queens College, Southern Methodist University, and Northern Kentucky University. She is the author of "Media, Race, Crime, and the Punishment: Re-Framing Stereotypes in Crime and Human Rights Issues," which was published in the DePaul Law Review in 2009.  In 2012, Lyon co-authored the paper "Digital Divisions: Racial (In)Justice and Limits of Social Informatics in The State of Georgia vs. Troy Anthony Davis," which was presented at the Northern Kentucky Law Review Symposium, and published in the Northern Kentucky Law Review.

Fundraising

In October 2013, Lyon joined the Jewish Federation of Cincinnati as Director of Special Gifts.

Selected filmography

References

External links 

Hate Crimes in the Heartland

Living people
American documentary film producers
American film directors
American women documentary filmmakers
Year of birth missing (living people)
21st-century American women